Thomas Lawrence McNamara, Sr. (November 18, 1882 – July 21, 1939) was an American professional golfer.

Biography
McNamara was born in Brookline, Massachusetts to an immigrant Irish family. His parents were Thomas McNamara (1841–1909) and Mariah McNamara née Curry (1851–1940).

McNamara was the head professional at Wollaston Golf Club. During the 1909 U.S. Open, McNamara became the first man ever to break 70 in a competitive American tournament.  McNamara held a three-stroke lead in the 1909 U.S. Open heading to the back nine.  Due to the extremely hot temperatures, McNamara suffered a heatstroke on the 14th hole. After doctors treated him, he insisted on finishing the tournament.  He succeeded in finishing, but his game collapsed down the stretch and finished second.  The following year, 1910, he served as the head golf professional at the Fall River Country Club in Fall River, Massachusetts.

McNamara was considered one of American's best homegrown professionals during the early twentieth century.  He was head professional at Siwanoy Country Club in Bronxville, New York.  He proposed the idea of a national tournament to his boss, Rodman Wanamaker. McNamara was the manager of the golf department in Wanamaker's New York City department store. Thus came the PGA Championship, first played in 1916 at Siwanoy Country Club.

Family
McNamara was born to Thomas McNamara (1841–1909) and Mariah McNamara née Curry (1851–1940). McNamara and his wife Mary had seven children.

Death
McNamara died, from coronary thrombosis, at his home in Mount Vernon, New York on July 21, 1939.

Tournament wins
this list may be incomplete
1912 North and South Open, Metropolitan Open
1913 North and South Open, Massachusetts Open
1914 Philadelphia Open Championship
1915 Western Open, Philadelphia Open Championship

Results in major championships

Note: The Masters Tournament was not founded until 1934.
NYF = Tournament not yet founded
NT = No tournament
DNP = Did not play
CUT = missed the half-way cut
R64, R32, R16, QF, SF = Round in which player lost in PGA Championship match play
"T" indicates a tie for a place
Yellow background for top-10

Team appearances
France–United States Professional Match (representing the United States): 1913

References

American male golfers
Golfers from Massachusetts
Golfers from New York (state)
Sportspeople from Brookline, Massachusetts
Sportspeople from Mount Vernon, New York
Deaths from coronary thrombosis
1882 births
1939 deaths